Stars Hollow is a fictional town in Connecticut featured on the television show Gilmore Girls and the Netflix miniseries Gilmore Girls: A Year in the Life. It is the town in which the protagonists  Lorelai Gilmore and her daughter Rory Gilmore reside. Stars Hollow is a close-knit community located roughly thirty minutes from Hartford. The original town square set was located on the Warner Bros. studio back lot, just around the corner from the exterior set for the hospital from ER.

History of Stars Hollow

Founding 
The town of Stars Hollow was founded in 1779 with conflicting legends regarding how it got its name. The traditionally accepted legend involves two star-crossed lovers who seemed destined never to be together, until separate cosmological phenomena involving stars led them to each other at the spot where the town now exists. This is celebrated annually at the Firelight Festival, shown in season one, episode 16, "Star-Crossed Lovers and Other Strangers" and season four, episode 13, "Nag Hammadi is Where They Found the Gnostic Gospels." Some within the town doubt the theory, such as when  Luke Danes remarks it's just as likely the town is named after a hypothetical sex worker named Star.

Another story of Stars Hollow's founding was presented in the season five, episode 18, "To Die and Let Diorama."  A talking display built in the new Stars Hollow Museum explained that a Puritan family first discovered the area while looking for a place to settle.  They named it as such because of "the stars, so bright; this forest, so hollow!"

The Revolutionary War 
During the American Revolutionary War, a "battle" fought in Stars Hollow when 12 men stood and waited for the Redcoats who never came. This battle is re-enacted annually in the town square, as seen in season one, episode eight, "Love and War and Snow" and in season five, episode 11, "Women of Questionable Morals." This second occurrence marked the beginning of the addition of the town  prostitute, who slept with the British general to delay the troops.

A statue of Casimir Pulaski, Polish nobleman, soldier, and military commander who has been called, together with his counterpart Michael Kovats de Fabriczy, "the father of the American cavalry." sits across from the town square, next to Luke's Diner. 

On the town square's gazebo is the town's Liberty Bell sign, which reads:

Town Square 
The center of town consists primarily of businesses surrounding a park with a gazebo. The town square is the location of Luke's Diner, Doose's Market, Miss Patty's dance studio (which hosts town meetings), the town's house of worship (which functions as both a church and synagogue), and the public high school. In the Gilmore Girls: A Year in the Life episode "Summer," the office of The Stars Hollow Gazette is shown to be located here, as well. 

The town square serves as a primary setting throughout the Gilmore Girls TV show and Gilmore Girls: A Year in the Life. Many town functions and private events are held in this area, including the Firelight Festival and the Battle of Stars Hollow. In the Gilmore Girls series finale "Bon Voyage," Rory's farewell party is held in a rainstorm under a tent in the park. The wedding of Lorelai and Luke takes place in the gazebo in "Fall," the fourth episode of Gilmore Girls: A Year in the Life.

Third Street 
Third Street is the location of the Dragonfly Inn, which Lorelai and Sookie St. James purchase in season three after its previous owner, Fran Weston, dies in episode 20, "Say Goodnight, Gracie." The inn undergoes renovations throughout season four until its test-run opening in episode 22, "Raincoats and Recipes." It remains Lorelai and Sookie's primary business for the rest of the show.

According to the Stars Hollow Historical Society, Third Street is among the town's worst historical landmarks to take your children. In the 18th century, it was known as "Sores and Boils Alley," where sick and suffering people throughout the region came to have sores and boils lanced. A small leper colony is said to have existed there as well.

In the sixth season's sixth episode, "Welcome to the Doll House," it's revealed that throughout history Third Street held various other names, aside from the aforementioned "Sores and Boils Alley," including "Constabulary Road," "Crusty Bulge," and a Nipmuc name, "Chargogagogmanchogagogcharbunagunggamog." The Nipmuc name is said to mean, "You fish on your side of the lake, I'll fish on my side, and no one will fish in the middle." According to  Kirk Gleason, it could also mean "Buffalo." This place-name is based on the local name for a lake in Webster, Massachusetts, which is more formally known as Webster Lake.

Location 
Stars Hollow was inspired by and is loosely based on several real communities in Connecticut: the villages of Kent, Washington Depot and West Hartford, and the town of New Milford.  The show's writer spent three weeks at the Mayflower Grace in Washington, Connecticut. Sherman-Palladino later said, "Now, I've never been there in winter, when you're snowed in and you can't go anywhere, and you and your husband want to kill each other because you can't go to a movie. But at the time I was there, it was beautiful, it was magical, and it was feeling of warmth and small-town camaraderie. . . . There was a longing for that in my own life, and I thought – that's something that I would really love to put out there."

Greg Morago of the Hartford Courant writes, "Unlike the Hartford depicted on Judging Amy, the Stars Hollow of The Gilmore Girls rings true. The town's antiques shops, small businesses, schools, government and infrastructure look the part. But where Sherman-Palladino has truly excelled, despite her Clueless origins, is in her drawing of colorful Connecticut characters. The populace of Stars Hollow, from the town busybody to the town troubadour, is familiar to any Nutmegger who ever attended a town meeting."

References

Gilmore Girls
Fictional populated places in Connecticut